James Calhoun Tanner (February 27, 1926 – December 5, 2019) was a journalist who covered the oil and gas industry for The Wall Street Journal for many years.  He was part of the team that won the 1961 Gerald Loeb Award for Newspapers.

Early life
Tanner was born on February 27, 1926, in Killeen, Texas. He earned his B.A. in journalism from the University of Texas at Austin.

Tanner served in the U.S. Army during World War II. After the war, he was commissioned as a first lieutenant in the Texas National Guard.

Career
Tanner began his career with the Valley Morning Star. He then served as the Killeen bureau chief for the Temple Telegram.

In 1949, Tanner and his wife, Trinnia, founded the Killeen Publishing Company to purchase and operate the Killeen Daily Herald the following year. Tanner was the president and editor, while Trinnia was the treasurer and a columnist. In 1954, Tanner sold the newspaper to James Gresham and joined the Dallas office of The Wall Street Journal.

Tanner covered the oil and gas industry as a staff reporter for the Journal.  In 1961, he was part of the Journal team that received a Gerald Loeb Award for "New Millionaires". He received the Frank Kelley Memorial Award for excellence in journalism from the American Association of Petroleum Landmen in 1968 for the article "Food from Fuel", which tells the story of T. W. Murray's rise to prominence in the oil industry. Tanner was the natural resources editor by 1977, and oil editor when he left the paper in 1981.

In 1981, Tanner was appointed Vice President in charge of the newly created international publications division of the Petroleum Information Corporation, where he edited Petroleum Information International, a global energy newsletter.

Tanner returned to The Wall Street Journal by 1986. In 1993, he was included in Forbes magazine's MediaGuide 500: A Review of The Nations Most Important Journalists.

Personal life
Tanner married Trinna Lanelle Farley in Temple, Texas, on April 4, 1947. Trinna was born in Temple on May 13, 1928.

Tanner retired from the Texas National Guard as a first lieutenant in 1960.

Trinna died on May 3, 2015, in Houston, Texas. Tanner died in Houston on December 5, 2019.

References

1926 births
2019 deaths
20th-century American journalists
American male journalists
Gerald Loeb Award winners for Newspaper
University of Texas at Austin alumni
The Wall Street Journal people
People from Killeen, Texas